The Silver Age of Comic Books was a period of artistic advancement and commercial success in mainstream American comic books, predominantly in the superhero genre, that lasted roughly from 1956 to the late 1960s/early 1970s.  Many editors, writers, pencillers and inkers participated in this revival.

Editors
 Dick Giordano
 Stan Lee
 Jack Schiff
 Julius Schwartz
 Mort Weisinger

Writers
 Otto Binder
 John Broome
 Arnold Drake
 Gardner Fox
 Gary Friedrich
 Joe Gill
 Archie Goodwin
 Edmond Hamilton
 Bob Haney
 Robert Kanigher
 Stan Lee
 Larry Lieber
 Dennis O'Neil
 Jerry Siegel
 Jim Steranko
 Roy Thomas

Pencilers

 Neal Adams
 Murphy Anderson
 Ross Andru
 Jim Aparo
 Dick Ayers
 Wayne Boring
 John Buscema
 Sal Buscema
 Nick Cardy
 Gene Colan a.k.a. Adam Austin
 Dan DeCarlo
 Steve Ditko
 Ramona Fradon
 Stan Goldberg
 Don Heck
 Carmine Infantino
 Gil Kane a.k.a. Scott Edwards
 Jack Kirby
 Joe Kubert
 Larry Lieber
 Sheldon Moldoff
 Jim Mooney
 John Romita, Sr.
 Kurt Schaffenberger
 Mike Sekowsky
 John Severin
 Marie Severin
 Jim Steranko
 Curt Swan
 Herb Trimpe
 George Tuska
 Wally Wood

Inkers
 Jack Abel
 Sol Brodsky
 Dan Adkins
 Murphy Anderson
 Dick Ayers 
 Vince Colletta
 Mike Esposito a.k.a. Mickey Demeo
 Frank Giacoia a.k.a. Frank Ray
 Joe Giella
 Sid Greene
 George Klein
 Tom Palmer
 Paul Reinman
 George Roussos a.k.a. George Bell
 Christopher Rule
 Joe Sinnott
 Chic Stone

Letterers
 Joe Rosen

References

Silver Age
Silver Age of Comic Books